"Looking for a Star" is a country-dance song by the Swedish band Rednex, released in 2007 via MMS Records, as the fourth single of their independently released third studio album The Cotton Eye Joe Show.

Track listing
"Looking for a Star (Original Single Version)" - 3:18
"Looking for a Star (Instrumental Version)" - 3:18

Charts

2007 singles
2007 songs
Rednex songs